Balutungi High School is a higher secondary school established in 1951 and located in the village of Jasaitala, Balutungi, Lalgola in the Murshidabad district, West Bengal, India.

References

High schools and secondary schools in West Bengal
Schools in Murshidabad district
Educational institutions established in 1951
1951 establishments in India